Wrestling Dontaku 2009 was a professional wrestling pay-per-view (PPV) event promoted by New Japan Pro-Wrestling (NJPW). The event took place on May 3, 2009, in Fukuoka, Fukuoka, at the Fukuoka Kokusai Center. The event featured nine matches (including one dark match), one of which was contested for a championship. It was the sixth event and first in eight years under the Wrestling Dontaku name.

Storylines
Wrestling Dontaku 2009 featured nine professional wrestling matches that involved different wrestlers from pre-existing scripted feuds and storylines. Wrestlers portrayed villains, heroes, or less distinguishable characters in the scripted events that built tension and culminated in a wrestling match or series of matches.

Event
Cima from Dragon Gate worked the event as an outsider. In the semi main event of the evening, Giant Bernard and Karl Anderson defeated Tencozy (Hiroyoshi Tenzan and Satoshi Kojima) to become the number one contenders to the IWGP Tag Team Championship. In the main event, Hiroshi Tanahashi successfully defended the IWGP Heavyweight Championship against the winner of the 2009 New Japan Cup, Hirooki Goto, and afterwards nominated Manabu Nakanishi as his next challenger.

Aftermath
Three days after Wrestling Dontaku 2009, Manabu Nakanishi defeated Hiroshi Tanahashi to win the IWGP Heavyweight Championship for the first time in what was considered a major upset.

Results

References

External links
The official New Japan Pro-Wrestling website

2009
2009 in professional wrestling
2009 in Japan
May 2009 events in Japan